The Hangmen are a three piece band from the North East of England who play their own compositions. Musically they are a punk-rockabilly hybrid often categorised as 'psychobilly', with dark and often dramatic lyrics.

The instrumentation is vocals, guitar, double bass and drums.

To date they have released nine albums, one of these Play Dead being a live concert recording. They have also released two 7-inch EPs, a 10-inch EP, a split 7-inch single and a download single. They have appeared on eighteen compilation albums, one of which was a covermount on 'Big Cheese Magazine'.

They've were prominently featured in the book 'Hell's Bent On Rocking' by Craig Brackenridge about the 'Psychobilly' movement and have appeared in cinematic documentaries such as 'New York Rumble' (USA) and 'The Story Of Psychobillies' (DE) as well as 'Live From the Charlotte' (UK) which showcased bands performing live at a festival in Leicester, England. 

Their live activities have included many festivals and repeated tours internationally across countries which include The UK, USA, Canada, The Netherlands, Russia, Germany, France, Finland, Spain, Catalonia, Hungary, Austria, Czech, Slovenia, Croatia and Belgium.

Personnel
Loz Firewalker (Guitar, Lead Vocals)
Andy Boyce (Double bass, Backing Vocals)
Garry McKenna (Drums)

Discography

Albums

EPs and singles

See also
List of psychobilly bands
punk rock bands

References

External links

The Hangmen on YouTube

The Hangmen on Spotify

The Hangmen on Instagram

English punk rock groups
British psychobilly musical groups
Rockabilly music groups
Musical groups from North East England